Brevinema may refer to:
 Brevinema (nematode), a genus of nematodes in the family Tetradonematidae
 Brevinema (bacterium), a genus of bacteria in the family Brevinemataceae
 Brevinema, a genus of nematodes in the family Longidoridae, synonym of Longidorus